Jhon Mario Ramírez (2 December 1971 – 26 June 2021) was a Colombian football manager and former player who played as a midfielder. He last worked as manager of Patriotas.

Club career
Ramírez was well known in Bogotá, where he was a fan favorite during the mid-1990s when he played for Millonarios. He also played club football for Deportivo Cali, Deportes Tolima, Independiente Santa Fe, Boyacá Chicó F.C. and Deportivo Pereira. Ramírez filed a claim against his former team Deportes Tolima, arguing that the club had cancelled his playing contract without cause. In 2008, the Supreme Court of Colombia denied Ramirez's claim for compensation.

International career
He was also part of the Colombia national team. His last game for the national team was a friendly against Norway in 1997.

Death
Ramírez died on 26 June 2021, aged 49 at San Rafael hospital in Tunja after contracting COVID-19 amid the COVID-19 pandemic in Colombia.

References

External links

1971 births
2021 deaths
Colombian footballers
Colombia international footballers
Millonarios F.C. players
Deportivo Cali footballers
Deportes Tolima footballers
Independiente Santa Fe footballers
Boyacá Chicó F.C. footballers
Deportivo Pereira footballers
Association football midfielders
Colombian football managers
Footballers from Bogotá
Deaths from the COVID-19 pandemic in Colombia
Patriotas Boyacá managers